Julio Cesar Moreira Ribeiro (born 18 April 1995), commonly known as Julio Cesar, is a Brazilian footballer who plays as a striker, most recently for Xagħra United.

Career
Julio Cesar is a product of Guaratinguetá youth sportive system and in 2016 he played for this team in the Campeonato Paulista Série A3.

In February 2018 he signed a contract with the Ukrainian Premier League's FC Veres Rivne.

In 2021, Cesar played for Maltese club Xagħra United.

References

External links
Julio Cesar at playmakerstats.com (English version of ogol.com.br)

1995 births
Living people
Brazilian footballers
Association football forwards
Guaratinguetá Futebol players
NK Veres Rivne players
FC Lviv players
Lagarto Futebol Clube players
Xagħra United F.C. players
Ukrainian Premier League players
Brazilian expatriate footballers
Expatriate footballers in Ukraine
Brazilian expatriate sportspeople in Ukraine
Expatriate footballers in Malta
Brazilian expatriate sportspeople in Malta
Footballers from São Paulo (state)